Rubrocurcumin is a red-colored dye that is formed by the reaction of curcumin and borates.

Synthesis 
The reaction of curcumin with borates in presence of oxalic acid produces rubrocurcumin.

Characteristics 
Rubrocurcumin produces a red colored solution.

Rubrocurcumin is a neutrally charged composition, while rosocyanine is produced from  ions. In rubrocurcumin, one molecule of curcumin is replaced with oxalate compared to rosocyanine.

Complexes with boron such as rubrocurcumin are called 1,3,2-dioxaborines.

References

Further reading 

 

Curcuminoid dyes
Tetrahydroxyborate esters
Complexometric indicators
Oxalate esters